John A. Wagner (May 26, 1885 - December 8, 1964) was a politician from the U.S. state of Michigan.

Early life 
On May 26, 1885, Wagner was born in Le Roy Township, Calhoun County, Michigan. Wagner's grandfather was John Wagner, an early settler. Wagner's father was Frank N. Wagner. Wagner's mother was Aylett Amanda (nee Addington) Wagner. In 1905, Wagner graduated from Battle Creek high school.

Education 
Wagner earned a Bachelor of Laws from University of Michigan.

Career 
Wagner practiced Law in Battle Creek, Michigan. 

Wagner was Chair of the Michigan Republican Party from 1945 to 1949 and a delegate to the 1948 Republican National Convention.

Personal life 
On June 29, 1909, Wagner married Alice M. Goucher. They have 1 child, Alice Belden Wagner (b.1911). Wagner and his family lived in Battle Creek, Michigan.

References

External link 
 Wagner family in Le Roy Township

1885 births
1964 deaths
Michigan Republican Party chairs
Michigan Republicans
People from Battle Creek, Michigan
 University of Michigan Law School alumni